Nicolás Quijera Poza (born 24 June 1996 in Pamplona) is a Spanish athlete specialising in the javelin throw. He won a gold medal at the 2018 Mediterranean Games.

His personal best in the event is 80.21	metres set in Eugene in 2018.

International competitions

References

1996 births
Living people
Spanish male javelin throwers
Spanish expatriates in the United States
Sportspeople from Pamplona
Mediterranean Games gold medalists for Spain
Mediterranean Games medalists in athletics
Athletes (track and field) at the 2018 Mediterranean Games
Mediterranean Games gold medalists in athletics